Cristinápolis is the southernmost municipality in the Brazilian state of Sergipe. Its population was 18,029 in the year 2020, and its area is 251.3 km².

References

Municipalities in Sergipe